In 1767, the 11-year-old composer Wolfgang Amadeus Mozart was struck by smallpox. Like all smallpox victims, he was at serious risk of dying, but he survived the disease. This article discusses smallpox as it existed in Mozart's time, the decision taken in 1764 by Mozart's father Leopold not to inoculate his children against the disease, the course of Mozart's illness, and the aftermath.

Smallpox in Mozart's day

Smallpox in 18th-century Europe was a devastating disease, recurring frequently in epidemics and killing or disfiguring millions of people. The 18th century was probably a particularly terrible time for smallpox in Europe: urbanization had increased crowding, making it easier for the disease to spread; yet effective protection from smallpox through a smallpox vaccine was discovered only at the end of the century (see below).

The disease was a terrible one for its victims. Ian and Jenifer Glynn write:
So what was it like? As children, we were told it was like chickenpox but worse. In fact it is not related to chickenpox, and it was unimaginably worse. In an unvaccinated population, something like 10–30 percent of all patients with smallpox would be expected to die. And dying was not easy; smallpox was, as Macaulay wrote, 'the most terrible of all the ministers of death.'

Those who survived smallpox did not always survive intact; it frequently inflicted blindness on its survivors. The survival rate was particularly low for children.

The physical appearance of the disease was frightening to patients and to their caretakers: the patient's skin became covered with large, bulging pustules, which often left conspicuous pitting on the skin of patients who survived the disease.

Leopold's decision against inoculation
Medicine had made only slight progress against the disease in Mozart's time. Around the second decade of the 18th century the method of inoculation, which had originated in Asia, reached European countries. Inoculation was not the same as the vaccination which later succeeded in eradicating the disease; rather, an inoculated person was treated with live smallpox virus, taken from pustules of the mildest variety of smallpox that could be found.

Inoculation offered immunity to smallpox, but the procedure carried a definite risk that the inoculated person could die from smallpox as a result. Thus, many parents felt that they would rather do nothing, risking future smallpox arriving at random, rather than carry out a deliberate act that might well kill their children immediately.

As Mozart biographer Ruth Halliwell points out, it is in this context that we must interpret a letter sent by Leopold Mozart on 22 February 1764 to his landlord and friend Lorenz Hagenauer concerning smallpox:
They are trying to persuade me to let my boy be inoculated with smallpox. But as I have expressed sufficiently clearly my aversion to this impertinence they are leaving me in peace. Here inoculation is the general fashion. But for my part I leave the matter to the grace of God. It depends on His grace whether He wishes to keep this prodigy of nature in this world in which He placed it or to take it to Himself.

From the modern perspective—with most children now made safe from several terrible diseases by vaccination—it is easy to make the superficial interpretation that Leopold was acting foolishly, relying on divine will when direct action was available that would have helped his children. However, since in Leopold's day it was not firmly established that inoculation was beneficial, his remarks can be seen to be more of appeal to religion to resolve what must have seemed an impossible dilemma.

Mozart's case of smallpox
The Mozart family (Wolfgang, his father Leopold, his mother Anna Maria, and his older sister Nannerl) left their home in Salzburg for Vienna on 11 September, 1767. They had been there before, exhibiting the children's talents, in 1762; by this time they had completed their "Grand Tour" of Europe, performing in England, France, and elsewhere, and hoped to achieve even greater recognition (and income) in the Imperial capital. The forthcoming marriage of the 16-year-old Archduchess Maria Josepha, daughter of Empress Maria Theresa, scheduled for October 14, promised many festivities and thus opportunities for visiting musicians.

Unfortunately, there was an outbreak of smallpox in Vienna at the time. On 28 May of that year, Emperor Joseph II had lost his second wife Maria Josepha to the disease, and his mother Maria Theresa also caught it (she survived). The imperial bride-to-be Maria Josepha caught the disease in October and died of it on the 15th, the day after she had been scheduled to be married.In the following week, presumably before the onset of his illness, the 11-year-old composer wrote an inexplicably cheerful elegy, a fragmentary duet for two sopranos in F major (K. Anh.24a/43a) to an anonymous text:

Ach, was müssen wir erfahren!
Wie? Josepha lebt nicht mehr!
Sie gibt in den schönsten Jahren
Sich zum Todesopfer mehr.
Nicht die Glut der frohen Jugend,
Nicht die angestammte Tugend,
Der sie ganz gewidmet war,
Schützt sie vor der kalten Bahr.
Oh, what we must know!
How? Josepha lives no more.
She gives herself to be death's offering
In the most beautiful of years.
Neither the glow of happy youth,
Nor the ancestral virtue
To which she was wholly dedicated,
Protects her from the cold stretcher., soloists of the WebernKammerchor, University of Music and Performing Arts Vienna

The Mozarts were renting rooms in the home of the goldsmith Johann Schmalecker, and were horrified when all three of Schmalecker's children came down with smallpox. Alarmed, Leopold first left Schmalacker's house, taking Wolfgang (only) with him (17 October). Six days later (23 October), the entire family fled the city.

They headed north, into what today is the Czech Republic, first reaching Brno (then called by its German name, Brünn), where they called on the Count Franz Anton Schrattenbach, brother of Leopold's employer in Salzburg, the Prince-Archbishop Sigismund von Schrattenbach. Count Schrattenbach invited them to give a concert, but Leopold, impelled by an "inner urge," wanted to go farther, and the family continued northward after two days to Olmütz (today Olomouc). It was there that, on 26 October, Wolfgang showed the first symptoms of smallpox. Given the incubation period of the disease (roughly, 12 days), it can be ascertained that he had already caught it in Vienna.

Leopold consulted an acquaintance, Count Leopold Anton Podstatsky, who was dean of the Cathedral and rector of the University in Olmütz. Leopold had known Podstatsky when the Count had previously worked in Salzburg. The count, learning that Wolfgang was showing symptoms of smallpox, insisted that the Mozarts move into his home, and he placed Mozart under the excellent care of his personal physician, Dr. Joseph Wolff.

Leopold later wrote:
Wolfgang was complaining of his eyes. I noticed his head was warm, that his cheeks were hot and very red, but that his hands were cold as ice. Moreover, his pulse was not right. So we gave him some black powder and put him to bed. During the night he was rather restless and in the morning he still had the dry fever.

A frightening symptom of Wolfgang's illness, not made explicit in Leopold's letter, was an inability to see. In a letter written much later (1800), his sister Nannerl reported:
He caught the smallpox, which made him so ill that he could see nothing for nine days and had to spare his eyes for several weeks after his recovery.

Although blindness was indeed a common result of smallpox, ophthalmologist Richard H. C. Zegers suggests that Mozart's symptoms did not represent actual blindness, but rather resulted from the pustular rash of the disease affecting his eyelids.

By 10 November, Wolfgang was feeling better, but then Nannerl also contracted smallpox, and was ill for three weeks. The Mozart children were thereafter safe from the disease, which confers immunity on its survivors. According to Leopold, both children were pitted in the locations of the former pustules, but neither seriously.

During his recovery, Wolfgang, who needed to spare his eyes, spent the time learning card tricks and fencing.

With both children's illness to contend with, the Mozarts spent a total of four months away from Vienna. They eventually returned there and were received in the Imperial court on 19 January, 1768. The Empress, who had by now lost three children to smallpox, conversed with Frau Mozart about the disease.

The remainder of the trip was not especially successful. Leopold apparently misinterpreted a chance remark of the Emperor as a firm invitation for Wolfgang to compose an opera; this resulted in Wolfgang writing La finta semplice. However, the opera went unperformed in Vienna; the singers and musicians did not like it, and intrigues prevented the work from reaching the stage. La finta semplice eventually was premiered in Salzburg, following the Mozarts' return there on 5 January 1769.

Later history

The experience of losing three of her children to smallpox led Empress Maria Theresa to become a convert to inoculation. In 1768, she engaged the Dutch physician Jan Ingenhousz to conduct an inoculation program. Ingenhousz's program worked first among poor people, with the goal of developing a weakened strain of the disease; poor parents in Vienna were paid a ducat to have their children inoculated. The inoculations performed with this weakened strain on the imperial family were successful, and led to greater public acceptance for the procedure.

Smallpox struck the Mozart family again in the next generation: Nannerl's eldest son Leopold and two of her stepchildren caught the disease during an outbreak in the Salzburg area in 1787. All three children survived.

In 1796, the discovery of vaccination—the use of the related cowpox virus to immunize against smallpox—by Edward Jenner revolutionized the ability of medicine to deal with smallpox. Vaccination reached Vienna around 1800, when yet another local epidemic created impetus for its adoption. One of the doctors trained in the Vienna campaign, named Doutrepout, then brought vaccination to Mozart's native city of Salzburg. According to Halliwell, "popular resistance was fierce," and both the government and the Roman Catholic Church (previously an opponent) took stern measures to promote vaccination. The first relative of Mozart's known to have been vaccinated was Johanna Berchtold von Sonnenberg, called "Jeannette" (1789–1805), Nannerl's youngest child; she was vaccinated during the 1802 campaign in Salzburg.

With vaccination, great progress was made in reducing incidence of the disease, and it was eventually confirmed as eradicated in 1979.

Notes

Sources
 
 
 
 
 
 
 
 
 

Smallpox
Mozart, Wolfgang Amadeus
Health by individual
Health in Austria